KQMG may refer to:

 KQMG (AM), a radio station (1220 AM) licensed to serve Independence, Iowa, United States
 KQMG-FM, a radio station (95.3 FM) licensed to serve Independence, Iowa